Mont Bonvin is a mountain of the Bernese Alps, overlooking Crans-Montana in the Swiss canton of Valais. The border with the canton of Bern runs one kilometre north of the summit.

Mont Bonvin is located near the Plaine Morte Glacier, which can be reached from Crans-Montana by a cable car. From the upper station, a trail lead to the summit.

References

External links
 Mont Bonvin on Hikr

Mountains of the Alps
Mountains of Switzerland
Mountains of Valais
Two-thousanders of Switzerland